Lulesia densifolia is a species of fungus that was first described by Rolf Singer in 1970. It is the type species of the Lulesia genus. As with the other two species in this genus, L. densifolia is found in the tropics.

References

Tricholomataceae
Fungi described in 1970
Taxa named by Rolf Singer